The 2016 Big 12 Conference football season will represent the 21st season of Big 12 Conference football, taking place during the 2016 NCAA Division I FBS football season. The season will begin with non-conference play on Friday, September 2, 2016, with Kansas State traveling to face Stanford. Big 12 Conference play will begin on Saturday, September 17, 2016, with Iowa State traveling to play TCU.

The 2016 season will be the fifth for the Big 12 since the 2010–13 Big 12 Conference realignment brought the Big 12 membership to its current form. The conference has ten members: Baylor, Iowa State, Kansas, Kansas State, Oklahoma, Oklahoma State, TCU, Texas, Texas Tech and West Virginia. The Big 12 is a Power Five conference under the College Football Playoff format, along with the ACC, the Big Ten, the Pac-12 and the SEC. As a 10-team league, the Big 12 will play a 9-game, round-robin conference schedule and each member will play 3 non-conference games–one of which must be against another Power Five conference foe. The conference championship will be awarded to the team with the highest conference winning percentage at the conclusion of league play. In the event of a tie atop the standings, the conference tiebreaker shall determine the champion.

The Big 12 Champion will earn a berth to the 2017 Sugar Bowl, to play the SEC Champion at the Mercedes-Benz Superdome in New Orleans, on January 2, 2017. If the Big 12 Champion or SEC Champion are selected for the College Football Playoff, then a replacement team from the league will be designated to represent its conference in the Sugar Bowl according to the league's rules.

Preseason

Recruiting

ESPN has not updated its class rankings since National Signing Day.  In May–July, 2016, Baylor lost a significant number of signees as a result of the school's sexual assault scandal, which led to the firing of many university employees, including head coach Art Briles.  Several of Baylor's top-ranked signees re-signed with other Big 12 schools, including Texas, TCU, Oklahoma and Oklahoma State.

Preseason poll

Preseason awards
2016 Preseason All-Big 12

Offensive Player of the Year: Baker Mayfield, Oklahoma, QB
Defensive Player of the Year: Malik Jefferson, Texas, LB
Newcomer of the Year: Kenny Hill, TCU, QB

Regular season

Week 1
Schedule and results:

Players of the week:

Week 2
Schedule and results:

Players of the week:

Week 3
Schedule and results:

Players of the week:

Week 4
Schedule and results:

Players of the week:

Week 5
Schedule and results:

Players of the week:

Week 6
Schedule and results:

Players of the week:

Week 7
Schedule and results:

Players of the week:

Week 8
Schedule and results:

Players of the week:

Week 9
Schedule and results:

Players of the week:

Week 10
Schedule and results:

Players of the week:

Week 11
Schedule and results:

Players of the week:

Week 12
Schedule and results:

Players of the week:

Week 13
Schedule and results:

Players of the week:

Week 14
Schedule and results:

Players of the week:

Rankings

Home game attendance

Bold – Exceed capacity
†Season High

Postseason

Bowl games

Rankings are from CFP rankings.  All times Central Time Zone.  Big 12 teams shown in bold.

References